The Immaculate Conception Parish (Bauan) is a Neo-classical church located in Bauan, Batangas in the Philippines. The church is the third and final relocation site of Bauan after its transfer from the shores of Bombon Lake (Taal Lake), to Durugto, to Lonal, and finally to its present site near the shores of Batangas Bay. The church is also one of the parishes administered by Fr. Manuel Blanco, who perfected the art of dyeing by means of plants in Bauan.

History

Earlier Churches
The Augustinian Chapter founded Bauan as a "visita" of Taal, on May 17, 1590. Fr. Diego de Avila, was appointed as the priest in charge of Bauan. On May 12, 1596, Fr. Idelfonso Bernal was appointed prior. In 1660, the town was annexed to Taal because of its insufficient number of "tributos". From its original site in the shores of Bombon river, Fr. Jose Rodriguez relocated the town to a place called Durugto in 1662. Later, Fr. Nicolas Rivera again relocated the town to a place known as Lonal. Fr. Rivera built a church, convent, schools, and a fort, all of strong materials. Finally on 1692, Fr. Simon Martinez, relocated the town in its present site.

Present Church
After the third relocation, Fr. Nicolas Rivera, built a church and convent of strong materials. Both church and convent were damaged by the typhoon of 1694. Fr. Ignacio Mercado, rebuilt them in 1695–97, but again were destroyed. Fr. Blas Vidal started the construction of masonry church in 1700 and was finished in 1710. Fr. Jose Victoria built the present church in 1762, under the direction of Don Juan Bandino. Fr. Hipolito Huerta finished the facade and continued the construction of the transept in 1856. Fr. Felipe Bravo completed it in 1861. Fr. Moises Santos and Felipe Garcia applied  the final decorations inside and outside in 1881 and 1894, respectively.

Fr. Jose Treviño built the convent in 1762 and the massive tower attached to the church in 1772. Fr. Alberto Tabores installed a huge bell in 1788. Fr. Manuel del Arco built the stone fence of the atrium in 1848, decorated it with artistic columns and an iron reja. He also built a new convent to replace the one built by Fr. Jose Treviño. Both tower and choir loft were destroyed in 1870 and were repaired in 1874 and a new clock was installed.

Devotion to the Holy Cross of Bauan
The church houses the Holy Cross of Bauan, the patron saint of the town. Found in 1595 by local natives in a place called Dingin, near Alitagtag, it was installed in Bauan's church. A golden sun, with radiating rays and embossed with a human face, was added at the point where the cross's arms intersect.

References

External links

Bauan Parish Church

Roman Catholic churches in Batangas
Religious organizations established in the 1590s
Roman Catholic churches completed in 1861
1590s establishments in the Philippines
Spanish Colonial architecture in the Philippines
Baroque church buildings in the Philippines
19th-century Roman Catholic church buildings in the Philippines
Churches in the Roman Catholic Archdiocese of Lipa